The 1933 GP Ouest-France was the third edition of the GP Ouest-France cycle race and was held on 29 August 1933. The race started and finished in Plouay. The race was won by Philippe Bono.

General classification

References

1933
1933 in road cycling
1933 in French sport